The Felicity-class is a class of water tractors (or tug boats) operated by Serco Marine Services in support of the United Kingdom's Naval Service. Historically the vessels were operated by the Royal Maritime Auxiliary Service, disbanded in March 2008.

Vessels in the class

See also
List of ships of Serco Marine Services

References

Royal Maritime Auxiliary Service
Serco Marine Services (ships)
Auxiliary ships of the Royal Navy